The last name Raabe specifically originates from Prussia, derived from a Prussian warrior clans' symbol: a raven, which was one of the four beasts of war. During Prussia's decimation, most of these warriors intermarried with the Danish, and slowly made their way to Germany and Austria. The last name "Rabe", however, originates in Germany. Rabe also means raven. Jewish surname of Raabe derived from Hebrew word Rav meaning Rabbi, which is a title given to a Jewish scholar or spiritual leader of a Jewish community. Recent historical bearers of the name "Raabe" may refer to:

Sigrid Solbakk Raabe (born 1996), Norwegian singer-songwriter
 Brian Raabe (born 1967), American baseball player
 Ed Raabe, owner of Raabe Racing Enterprises
 Hedwig Raabe (1844–1905), German actress 
 Herbert P. Raabe (1909–2004), German theorist, inventor and engineer, see Nyquist–Shannon sampling theorem
 Joseph Ludwig Raabe (1801–1859), Swiss mathematician
 Max Raabe (born 1962), German musician 
 Meinhardt Raabe (1915–2010), American actor
 Nancy Raabe (born 1954), American composer
 Peter Raabe (1872–1945), German composer
 Rudolph Raabe (1881–1968), American pharmacist and namesake of Ohio Northern University’s Raabe College of Pharmacy
 Sascha Raabe (born 1968), German politician
 Wilhelm Raabe (1831–1910), German novelist

See also
 Rabe (surname)
 Raab (disambiguation)

German-language surnames
Surnames from nicknames